Ashburn station is a Washington Metro station in Loudoun County, Virginia, United States, that serves as the Silver Line's western terminus. Originally planned to begin operation in 2018, the station opened on November 15, 2022.

Ashburn station is located at the median of the Dulles Greenway (SR 267) east of Old Ryan Road (SR 772). It is the farthest station from the Washington city center. The station has two pedestrian bridges leading to either side of the Dulles Greenway, with bus bays and kiss and ride lots on both sides, as well as 1,650 parking spaces on each side. There are bicycle racks for both sides of the highway and five bike lockers for the north entrance.

History 

The Silver Line was developed in the 21st century to link Washington, D.C., by rail to Washington Dulles International Airport and the edge cities of Tysons, Reston, Herndon, and Ashburn. The funding and planning of Phase 2 through Dulles Airport continued while Phase 1 was being constructed. In 2012, the Loudoun County Board of Supervisors voted 5 to 4 to extend the line to Dulles Airport and into the county. On April 25, 2013, the Phase 2 contract was issued at a cost of $1.177 billion.

In April 2015, project officials pushed back the opening date for the station to late 2019, stating that stricter requirements for stormwater management caused much of the delay.  Per officials, the line also had to incorporate improvements to the system's automated train controls that were a late addition to the project's first phase. Around the same time as this announcement, the Washington Metropolitan Area Transit Authority (WMATA) approved the Loudoun County Board of Supervisors' name for the stop.
In August 2019, project officials reported that they expected construction on the second phase of the Silver Line to be completed by mid-2020. The opening date was postponed to early 2021, then to late 2021. In February 2021, Metro announced that it would need five months to test the Phase 2 extension. The Metropolitan Washington Airports Authority (MWAA) then announced that the Phase 2 extension should be substantially complete by Labor Day 2021, although MWAA subsequently missed this deadline.

MWAA declared the work on the rail line to be "substantially complete" in November 2021. However, WMATA estimated that it could take five months of testing and other preparations before passenger service could begin. Simulated service testing began operating along the Phase 2 tracks in October 2022. Phase 2 was formally opened on November 15, 2022.

Station layout

References

2022 establishments in Virginia
Buildings and structures in Loudoun County, Virginia
Railway stations in highway medians
Railway stations in the United States opened in 2022
Stations on the Silver Line (Washington Metro)
Transportation in Loudoun County, Virginia
Washington Metro stations in Virginia